Eupithecia plumbeolata, the lead-coloured pug, is a moth of the family Geometridae. The species can be found all over Europe ranging to the Urals, then through Central Asia to Siberia and to Sayan mountains, the Altai and the Amur. In the Alps, the species occurs up 2000 metres above sea level and in the Pyrenees up to in 2400 metres.

The wingspan is 14–15 mm. The ground color of both forewings and hindwings is grey-brown to lead. All wings have alternating light and dark cross lines. These are weaker on the rear wings. Discal flecks have been identified. The abdomen is grey to grey-brown. The larva is grey-yellow with two red dorsal stripes. 

Depending on the location, the moth flies from May to June.

The larvae feed on Melampyrum pratense.

The species preferably inhabits light forests, forest edges, as well as hedge and bushes landscapes.

Subspecies
Eupithecia plumbeolata plumbeolata
Eupithecia plumbeolata lutosaria Bohatsch, 1893 Ukraine, to Asia minor, the Caucasus and in Georgia.

Similar species
Eupithecia haworthiata
Eupithecia valerianata
Eupithecia pygmaeata

References

External links

Lead-coloured Pug on UKmoths
Lepiforum.de

Moths described in 1809
plumbeolata
Moths of Europe
Moths of Asia
Insects of Iceland
Taxa named by Adrian Hardy Haworth